Manfred Zsak (born 22 December 1964 in Mödling) is a retired Austrian footballer who is currently the Assistant Coach for Austria.

Club career
Zsak started his professional career at Admira Wacker and moved to Austria Wien aged 23 and stayed with them for almost 10 years, captaining the side for most of his period at Austria. In 1996, he moved to GAK but left them after only a month and three matches to join FC Linz. He returned to his now renamed first team VfB Admira Wacker Mödling and suffered relegation with them to the second division in 1998.

He finished his career playing for lower league outfits SV Schwechat, ASK Bad Vöslau and SV Rust.

International career
He made his debut for Austria in an October 1986 3-0 win over Albania and was a participant at the 1990 FIFA World Cup. He earned 49 caps, scoring 5 goals. He ended his international career at a May 1993 World Cup qualification match against  Finland.

Coaching career 
Zsak was the head coach of the Austrian under-21 side, and then was named as Assistant Coach for the Austrian senior team.

Honours
Austrian Football Bundesliga (3):
 1991, 1992, 1993
Austrian Cup (3):
 1990, 1992, 1994

References

External links 
 Player profile - Austria Archive
 
 Steckbrief

1964 births
Living people
People from Mödling
Austrian footballers
Austria international footballers
1990 FIFA World Cup players
FC Admira Wacker Mödling players
FK Austria Wien players
Grazer AK players
Austrian Football Bundesliga players
Association football defenders
Association football midfielders
Footballers from Lower Austria
Association football coaches